Guo Songtao (11 April 1818 – 18 July 1891) was a Chinese diplomat and statesman during the Qing dynasty. He was among the first foreign emissaries to be sent abroad by the Qing government, as a result of the Tongzhi Restoration.

Early career
Guo was born in Xiangyin, Hunan in 1818. As a young man, Guo studied at the Yuelu Academy in Changsha, where he befriended Zeng Guofan. In 1847, Guo was awarded the highest degree in the imperial exams and soon afterwards he became a bachelor in the Hanlin Academy. In 1853, he was called to assist Zeng Guofan in joining the Xiang Army to suppress the Taiping Rebellion in their native province of Hunan. During the suppression of the Taipings Rebellion, Guo distinguished himself as a prominent advocate of the local likin tax as a means of financing the campaigns. In 1852 his forces recaptured Nanchang, Jiangxi from Taiping forces. He later also assisted Li Hongzhang's Huai Army in their campaigns against rebels in the Anhui province.

He called for foreign languages to be taught at a government school in 1859.

Diplomatic service
Guo became an important member of China's Self-Strengthening Movement in the 1860s and 70s and distinguished himself for his advocacy of a moderate and peaceful foreign policy. Guo became the first Qing minister to be stationed in a western country. He served as Minister to Britain and Minister to France from 1877 through 1879 as part of the United Kingdom's demands after the Margary Affair for an Imperial commissioner to be posted to Britain. In 1877 the English artist Walter Goodman was commissioned to paint his portrait, exhibited that year at the Royal Academy and later at the Walker Art Gallery in Liverpool. The whereabouts of this painting is unknown but a photograph taken of it at the time is in a private collection in England.

Advocacy of Railways
In July 1877 while serving as Chinese Minister to Britain, Guo led an entourage of legation officials  on a visit to the Ipswich engineering works of Ransomes and Rapier to see the manufacture of steam locomotives, railway equipment and other engineering products. He travelled from London to Ipswich by train and expressed his deep admiration for Britain's railway system, commenting that the distance travelled during the two-hour train journey would have taken two or three days in his own country.

He subsequently became a great proponent of railways and other modern engineering development in China, incurring the wrath of conservative and anti-railway Court officials, who resented his representations. In early 1878 he was also appointed Minister to France (concurrent with his British appointment) and moved to Paris, but in late 1878 he was ordered to return to China. Upon his return, fearful for his life because of his pro-foreign views, he returned to his home province and virtually retired from public life, spending his time writing and teaching in an academy.

Works
禮記質疑: 49卷 (1890)
使西紀程

Notes

References

Kuo, Sung-t'ao, Hsi-hung Liu, and Te-i Chang. *The First Chinese Embassy to the West; the Journals of Kuo-Sung-T'ao, Liu Hsi-Hung and Chang Te-Yi. Translated by J. D. Frodsham. Oxford: Clarendon Press, 1974.
Visit of the Chinese Ambassadors to Ipswich”, report in the “Ipswich Journal” July 3, 1877 ( Hong Kong Railway Society – P.A. Crush Chinese Railway Collection)
Day, Jenny Huangfu (2018). "The Scholar." Qing Travelers to the Far West: Diplomacy and the Information Order in Late Imperial China. Cambridge: Cambridge University Press.

External links

1818 births
1891 deaths
People from Yueyang
Qing dynasty diplomats
Ambassadors of China to the United Kingdom
Ambassadors of China to France
Qing dynasty politicians from Hunan
Xiang Army personnel
Ministers of Zongli Yamen